Czyżów Szlachecki Castle (Polish: Zamek w Czyżowie Szlacheckim) - a castle located in Czyżów Szlachecki, Świętokrzyskie Voivodeship; in Poland. The current castle is located in the location of the former Czyżowski Castle (from the fifteenth century), whose foundation was used to build the castle. The castle had undergone a restoration in 1978. In 1996, the castle was sold to Danuta and Bogusław Grabosiów, entrepreneurs from Mielec.

See also 
 Castles in Poland

References

Castles in Świętokrzyskie Voivodeship
Staszów County
Baroque castles in Poland